The 2021–22 Coupe de France preliminary rounds, Corsica was the qualifying competition to decide which teams from the leagues of the Corsica region of France took part in the main competition from the seventh round.

Two teams qualified from the Corsica preliminary rounds. In 2020–21, Gazélec Ajaccio progressed furthest in the main competition, reaching the round of 32 before losing to Lille.

Draws and fixtures
On 28 July 2021, the league announced that a total of 33 teams from the region had entered. A preliminary round, analogous to the second round in other regions, featured four clubs, with the winners going through to the third round, where they were joined by all other clubs from Championnat National 3 and below. The single Championnat National club joined the competition at the fifth round stage. The third round draw was published on 26 August 2021. The fourth round draw was published on 23 September 2021. The fifth round draw was published on 7 October 2021. The sixth round draw was made on 21 October 2021.

Second round
These matches were played on 12 September 2021.

Third round
These matches were played on 18 and 19 September 2021.

Fourth round
These matches were played on 2 and 3 October 2021.

Fifth round
These matches were played on 16 and 17 October 2021.

Sixth round
These matches were played on 30 and 31 October 2021.

References

preliminary rounds